Ivona Fialková (born 22 November 1994) is a Slovak biathlete. She was born in Brezno. She has competed in the Biathlon World Cup, and represented Slovakia at the Biathlon World Championships 2016. Her older sister Paulína Fialková is also Slovak biathlete.

Biathlon results
All results are sourced from the International Biathlon Union.

Olympic Games
0 medals

World Championships
0 medals

*During Olympic seasons competitions are only held for those events not included in the Olympic program.
**The single mixed relay was added as an event in 2019.

World Cup

References

External links

1994 births
Living people
Slovak female biathletes
Olympic biathletes of Slovakia
Biathletes at the 2012 Winter Youth Olympics
Biathletes at the 2018 Winter Olympics
Biathletes at the 2022 Winter Olympics
Sportspeople from Brezno